Zafar Ali Stadium is a multi-purpose stadium in Sahiwal, Punjab, Pakistan. From 1955 until 1995, it was used for first-class and List A cricket cricket matches.. The stadium has a capacity to house 10,000 people. 

The venue, formerly known as Sahiwal Stadium, was renamed as Zafar Ali Stadium in honor of Sheikh Zafar Ali Khan, the founder of the Pakistan Olympic Association.

References

External links
 
 

Football venues in Pakistan
Sahiwal District
Stadiums in Pakistan
Multi-purpose stadiums in Pakistan
Cricket grounds in Pakistan
Tourist attractions in Sahiwal